Bastard Sons of Johnny Cash are an Americana/alternative country band led by singer Mark Stuart.

The band formed in San Diego, California in 1995. They received permission to use Cash's name by Cash himself and were then personally invited to record songs for their first CD Walk Alone at Cash's home in Hendersonville, Tennessee.  The Bastard Sons of Johnny Cash have opened for Merle Haggard, and Willie Nelson at his annual 4th of July concert, and shared the stage with such notables as Buck Owens, John Hiatt, Lucinda Williams, George Jones, and Steve Earle.

Members
 Mark Stuart – vocals, guitar
 Vance Hazen – bass guitar
 Lars Albrect – guitar
 Jim Adair – drums

 Former members
 Dean Cote – guitar
 Joey Galvan – drums
 Clark Stacer – bass guitar
 Buzz Campbell – guitar
 Johnny D'Artenay – bass guitar
 Alex Watts – guitar
 Scott B. Hall – steel guitar/dobro
 Jeff Roberts – bass guitar

Discography
 Bastard Sons of Johnny Cash (1996, BSOJC) their "6-song Demo EP"
 Lasso Motel (1999, BSOJC) original issue with a total of 9 songs
 Walk Alone (2001, Ultimatum Music/Artemis) reissue of Lasso Motel with 3 new recordings added on for a total of 12 songs; reissued later with a new total of 14 songs.
 Distance Between (2002, Ultimatum Music/Artemis)
 Live at the Belly Up (2003 [rel. 2009], Texacali)
 Mile Markers (2005, Texacali/Emergent/92e)
 Live at Muhle Hunzigen (2006, Texacali) DVD
 Road to Texacali (2007, Paul!/Radio Blast Recordings) compilation of Walk Alone, Distance Between, and Mile Markers.
 Live in Sweden (2008, Texacali) DVD
 Bend in the Road as Mark Stuart & the Bastard Sons (2009, Texacali/Dualtone)
 New Old Story (2013, Randm Records)

References

 [ Biography] at Allmusic

External links

American alternative country groups
Musical groups established in 1995
Musical groups from San Diego
Musical quartets
Johnny Cash